In human anatomy, the superior mesenteric artery (SMA) is an artery which arises from the anterior surface of the abdominal aorta, just inferior to the origin of the celiac trunk, and supplies blood to the intestine from the lower part of the duodenum through two-thirds of the transverse colon, as well as the pancreas.

Structure

Origin 
In the adult, the SMA arises anterior to inferior border of vertebra L1. It is usually 1 cm lower than the celiac trunk.

Course and relations 
It initially travels in an anterior/inferior direction, passing behind/under the neck of the pancreas and the splenic vein.  Located under this portion of the superior mesenteric artery, between it and the aorta, are the following:
 left renal vein - travels between the left kidney and the inferior vena cava (can be compressed between the SMA and the abdominal aorta at this location, leading to nutcracker syndrome).
 the third part of the duodenum, a segment of the small intestines (can be compressed by the SMA at this location, leading to superior mesenteric artery syndrome).
 uncinate process of pancreas - this is a small part of the pancreas that hooks around the SMA.

The SMA typically runs to the left of its associated vein, the superior mesenteric vein. After passing the neck of the pancreas it starts giving off its branches.

Branches

The number of arterial arcades in the ileum is more than the number of arcades in the jejunum. 

The middle, right, and ileocecal branches anastomose with each other to form a marginal artery along the inner border of the colon. This artery is completed by branches of the left colic which is a branch of the inferior mesenteric artery.

Clinical significance
 Compared to other vessels of similar size, the SMA is largely spared from the effects of atherosclerosis. This may be due to protective haemodynamic conditions.
 Acute occlusion of the SMA almost invariably leads to intestinal ischemia and often has devastating consequences, with up to 80% of SMA occlusions leading to death.
 The SMA can compress the left renal vein, leading to nutcracker syndrome; and/or the third (horizontal) part of the duodenum, leading to superior mesenteric artery syndrome.

Additional images

References

External links
  - "Branches of the inferior mesenteric artery."
  - "Posterior Abdominal Wall: Branches of the Abdominal Aorta"
 
 
 
 
  - "Posterior Abdominal Wall, Dissection, Anterior View"
 

Arteries of the abdomen